Tresillian House may refer to:

Tresillian House, St Newlyn East, Cornwall, England
Tresilian House, Vale of Glamorgan, in Tresilian Bay, Wales